Genelux Corporation is a privately held, biopharmaceutical clinical stage company that was founded in 2001. The main focus of Genelux is oncolytic immunotherapy based on attenuated, genetically engineered oncolytic viruses as therapeutic agent.

In 2013 Genelux obtained the San Diego Business Journal Innovation Award in the category of Medical Research.

Locations
Genelux Corp. is headquartered in San Diego, California, with a business office in Redlands, California.

GL-ONC1
Genelux’s lead oncology compound is GL-ONC1 (clinical grade formulation of the laboratory strain GLV-1h68), an oncolytic vaccinia virus. In November 2013 GL-ONC1 has been selected as one of the "Top 10 Oncology Projects to Watch" by Elsevier Business Intelligence. Currently, GL-ONC1 is being evaluated in human clinical Phase I/II studies, including an ongoing Phase II trial in recurrent ovarian cancer. In those studies GL-ONC1 was shown to be well tolerated and evidence of tumor colonization and indications for therapeutic efficacy were observed.

Veterinary lead compound
In addition to GL-ONC1, Genelux sponsors a veterinary trial in dogs with cancer that is conducted at the CVS Angel Care Cancer Center in Carlsbad, California. The dogs are treated with V-VET1, a non-genetically modified vaccinia virus isolate (laboratory name LIVP6.1.1) with an inactive thymidine kinase gene.

Pipeline
The preclinical pipeline of Genelux includes numerous genetically modified vaccinia virus strains with transgenes encoding for reporter proteins for deep tissue imaging, angiogenesis modifying proteins, radiosensitzing proteins, prodrug converting enzymes, biomarkers and  immunomodulatory proteins.

References

External links
 Genelux website
 CVS Angel Care Cancer Center website

Experimental cancer treatments
Virotherapy
Oncolytic virus